The Henry Grady Hotel was a hotel in downtown Atlanta, Georgia, United States. The building, designed by architect G. Lloyd Preacher, was completed in 1924 at the intersection of Peachtree Street and Cain Street, on land owned by the government of Georgia that had previously been occupied by the official residence of the governor. The hotel, which was named after journalist Henry W. Grady, was owned by the state and leased to operators. During the mid-1900s, the hotel typically served as the residence of state legislators during the legislative sessions, and it was an important location for politicking, with President Jimmy Carter (who had previously served in the Georgia State Senate) later saying, "[m]ore of the state's business was probably conducted in the Henry Grady than in the state capitol". In the late 1960s, the government decided to not renew the building's lease when it expired in 1972, and it was demolished that year. The land was sold to developers and the Peachtree Plaza Hotel was built on the site. At the time of its completion in 1976, it was the tallest hotel building in the world.

History

Background and construction 
The Henry Grady Hotel was constructed in downtown Atlanta, at the intersection of Peachtree Street and Cain Street (now known as Andrew Young International Boulevard). The site had previously been the location of a Victorian Gothic mansion built in 1869 by architect William H. Parkins for businessman John H. James. That building and the land was later sold to the government of Georgia and was used as the official residence for the governor of Georgia between 1870 and 1921, housing seventeen governors during this time. Governor Hugh Dorsey was the last to live in the mansion, and after Thomas W. Hardwick became governor in 1921, he took up residence in the Georgian Terrace Hotel. In 1923, the building was demolished.

Following the mansion's demolition, construction began on a hotel at the site. The state government still owned the land, as well as the newly constructed hotel building. As a result, state taxes were not required to be paid by the operators of the building, but the government would generate revenue from it by leasing the hotel to private hotel managers. The building, designed by Atlanta-based architect G. Lloyd Preacher, was named the Henry Grady Hotel, after noted Atlanta journalist Henry W. Grady. The building was erected during a construction boom that was going on in the city and was one of several large hotels built during this time, which included the Hotel Ansley, the Atlanta Biltmore Hotel, and the Winecoff Hotel. In an article published by the Atlanta Chamber of Commerce during the hotel's construction, they stated that the Grady would be "one of the largest and most centrally located hotels in the city". The hotel was completed before Thanksgiving in 1924, with an estimated cost of $1 million.

The hotel proved to be a popular locale within the city. In its first few decades, it hosted meetings for the Atlanta League of Women Voters and served as the headquarters for radio station WATL. It was a popular venue for many of the big bands that visited Atlanta in the early 1900s, including the Coon-Sanders Original Nighthawk Orchestra. Starting in 1949, performers Dick Van Dyke and Phil Erickson had a five-year residency at the hotel.

Political importance 
However, the hotel was probably most notable for its connections to Georgian politics, with historian Floyd Hunter calling the hotel "politically famous". In the early 1900s, the Kimball House hotel had served as the lodging for state legislators while they were staying in Atlanta, Georgia's capital city. However, by 1930, the Henry Grady Hotel had become many politicians' Atlanta residences during the legislative sessions, and as a result, a great deal of politicking took place in the building. Influential politician Roy V. Harris had a suite in the building, with former Governor Herman Talmadge later describing it as a smoke-filled room. During the three governors controversy of 1947, both Talmadge and Melvin E. Thompson, who both claimed to be the legitimate governor, had their offices located in the hotel. In the 1960s, the hotel served as the campaign headquarters for Lester Maddox in his 1966 gubernatorial campaign, and the American Independent Party held their Georgia meeting at the hotel as part of George Wallace's 1968 presidential campaign. Additionally, the National Knights of the Ku Klux Klan had held a meeting and established a national committee in the hotel in 1960.

According to U.S. President Jimmy Carter, "[m]ore of the state's business was probably conducted in the Henry Grady than in the state capitol". Supporting this statement, a Georgia State Senator E. F. Griffith once said, "I don't believe the people of Georgia will ever know what's going on ... until they put loudspeakers in the Henry Grady Hotel and a few microphones under certain beds or behind the furniture". As an example, in 1946, Atlanta Mayor William B. Hartsfield first proposed plans for what would become the Downtown Connector roadway. Noted individuals who had suites in the hotel included businessman J. B. Fuqua, who stayed there to be closer to Georgian politicians, and Steadman Vincent Sanford, who served as the president of the University of Georgia and, later, the chancellor of the University System of Georgia.

In addition to its importance as a place of politicking, multiple individuals have made note of illicit acts and the atmosphere of debauchery that existed in the hotel while the politicians were there. During the Prohibition era in the 1930s, legislators would have couriers deliver illegal corn whiskey from Habersham County and Rabun County to the hotel. In a 1992 autobiography, Carter made note to an annual party that politicians held at the hotel on the first day of the legislative session. In a 1997 biography of Governor Zell Miller, biographer Richard Hyatt included a brief summary of such a party at the hotel on January 6, 1961, the first day of that year's legislative session, with legislators drinking alcohol, gambling, and holding a raffle among themselves for a chance to spend the night with a prostitute. Journalists for local newspapers, such as Bill Shipp of The Atlanta Constitution, would sometimes publish accounts of ongoings in the hotel, but many considered the topic off-limits and were largely uncritical of the events unfolding there.

Civil Rights protesting 
During the civil rights movement of the 1960s, the hotel was targeted by protestors because of its policy of racial segregation. On March 13, 1963, several African American students from the Atlanta University Center attempted to get seats at a restaurant in the hotel's lobby, but were denied based on their race. After two of the students refused to leave the premises, they were arrested. The other students who were not arrested staged a lie-in in the lobby that was later given national coverage in the magazine Jet. Additionally, the Committee on Appeal for Human Rights led a picketing protest outside the hotel. The hotel eventually desegregated following the passage of the Civil Rights Act of 1964.

Demolition 

In 1967, Georgia State Representative Tom Murphy, who was also a member of the State Properties Control Commission, argued that the hotel should be demolished and the land sold for private development. In his argument, he stated that the hotel was old and any operator of the building would be unlikely to fund renovations for the state-owned property. Additionally, the government could make more money in taxes from the property than it could from the lease. After some debate, it was decided to allow the building to stand until its current lease expired in 1972. On Labor Day of that year, the hotel was demolished by dynamite. In its place, the John C. Portman-designed Peachtree Plaza Hotel was constructed. This new hotel, which was completed in 1976, was at the time of its construction the tallest hotel building in the world.

Architecture 
The Henry Grady Hotel was located in downtown Atlanta, on the same city block as Davison's flagship department store, which was completed in the 1920s. The hotel had 13 floors, though in an example of triskaidekaphobia, the 13th floor was actually labeled the 14th floor. Additionally, no room numbers ended in "13". The hotel had 550 bedrooms and was finished with a stone and red brick façade, with the front entrance having a glass-covered veranda. In 1942, there were plans to add a 32-floor extension to the hotel that would have made it the tallest building in the city, though this plan never came to fruition.

See also 
 Hotels in Atlanta

Notes

References

Sources

Further reading

External links 

 

1924 establishments in Georgia (U.S. state)
1972 disestablishments in Georgia (U.S. state)
Buildings and structures demolished in 1972
Demolished hotels in Atlanta
G. Lloyd Preacher buildings
Hotel buildings completed in 1924